Mörschwang is a municipality in the district of Ried im Innkreis in the Austrian state of Upper Austria.

Geography
Mörschwang lies in the Innviertel. About 22 percent of the municipality is forest, and 69 percent is farmland.

References

Cities and towns in Ried im Innkreis District